The Port Murray Historic District is a historic district in the Port Murray section of Mansfield Township, Warren County, New Jersey. It was an important transportation location, being on the Morris Canal and the Morris and Essex Railroad. The district was added to the National Register of Historic Places on June 7, 1996 for its significance in community development, architecture, and transportation from 1828 to 1915.

Gallery

See also
 National Register of Historic Places listings in Warren County, New Jersey
 List of bridges on the National Register of Historic Places in New Jersey
 Port Colden Historic District

References

External links
 
 
 
 

Mansfield Township, Warren County, New Jersey
National Register of Historic Places in Warren County, New Jersey
Historic districts on the National Register of Historic Places in New Jersey
New Jersey Register of Historic Places
Italianate architecture in New Jersey
Second Empire architecture in New Jersey
Carpenter Gothic architecture in New Jersey